A Girl from the Reeperbahn is a 1930 Czech-German musical film directed by Karl Anton and starring Olga Chekhova, Trude Berliner, and Hans Adalbert Schlettow.

It was made in studios in the Czech capital Prague. Julius von Borsody worked on the film's set design. The film is set in a lighthouse on a small island  and on the Reeperbahn, the entertainment centre of the port city of Hamburg.

Cast
Olga Chekhova as Hanne Bull
Trude Berliner as Margot
Hans Adalbert Schlettow as Uwe Bull
Josef Rovenský as Nemý Jens
Manfred Koempel-Pilot as Sailor Pepito
Antonin Fric as churchman
Josef Kytka as bar visitor

References

External links

A Girl from the Reeperbahn at the Filmportal.de 

1930 musical films
German musical films
Czech musical films
Films of the Weimar Republic
Films directed by Karl Anton
Films set in Hamburg
German black-and-white films
Czechoslovak black-and-white films
1930s German films
1930s German-language films
German-language Czech films